The list of ship launches in 1674 includes a chronological list of some ships launched in 1674.


References

1674
Ship launches